Sapphire Lake is a lake located in the Trinity Alps Wilderness area, in Northern California. The lake sits in a granite bowl, where it is fed by rainwater that runs down the surrounding mountains.

Visitors can access the lake by hiking the Stuart Fork Trail and continuing past Emerald Lake.

See also
List of lakes in California

References

Klamath Mountains
Lakes of Trinity County, California
Lakes of California
Lakes of Northern California